Robert Albert Wessels is a South African Afrikaans singer and actor.

Discography 
Robbie Wessels released the following albums:
 My Vissermanvriend se Pa (2005)
 Halley se Komeet (2006)
 Afrika Sonsak (2009)
 Kaalvoet (2011)
 Als Wat Ek Het (2014)
 Woestyn (2017)
Staan Saam (2019)
Die Sluise van die Hemel (2020)

Filmography 
Robbie Wessels was cast in the following movies:
 Poena is Koning (2007) – Poena Pieterse
 Jakhalsdans (2010) – Himself
 'n Saak van Geloof (2011) – Kallie Naudé
 As Jy Sing (2013) – Bertie Bredenkamp
 100 Meter Leeuloop (2013) – Manie Mol / Ronnie Wentzel / Gazi / Bobby Bobbejaanski / Barberboy
Poena (2021) - Poena Pieterse
Poena & Poenie (2022) - Poena Pieterse

References

Year of birth missing (living people)
Afrikaner people
Afrikaans-language singers
21st-century South African male singers
South African male actors
Living people